Minster High School is a public high school in Minster, Ohio, in  northwestern Ohio.   It is the only high school in the Minster Local Schools district.  They are a member of the Midwest Athletic Conference.

Athletics
Minster is a member of the Midwest Athletic Conference.  Minster has won 40 team Ohio High School Athletic Association state tournaments, 4th best all-time in Ohio.

Ohio High School Athletic Association Championships

 Football - 1989, 2014, 2017 
 Girls Track and Field - 1976, 1977, 1978, 1979, 1980, 1982, 1985, 1989, 2001, 2002, 2003, 2004, 2018 
 Girls Cross Country - 1982, 1999, 2000, 2001, 2004, 2005, 2008, 2009, 2010, 2016, 2017, 2018, 2019, 2021, 2022
 Girls Basketball - 1998, 2004, 2018, 2019 
 Boys Golf - 2009 
Baseball - 2011, 2012, 2017
 Boys Track and Field - 2021

OHSAA State Runner-Up
 Boys Golf - 2006
 Girls Cross Country - 1986, 1988, 1990, 2002, 2006, 2015, 2020
 Football - 2016
 Volleyball - 1977
 Girls Track and Field - 1975, 1981, 1983, 1984, 2015, 2016, 2017
 Softball - 2014
 Baseball - 2003

OHSAA State Final Four
 Football - 1988
 Volleyball - 1976, 2001
 Girls Cross Country - 1985 (4th), 2003 (3rd), 2007 (3rd), 2014 (4th)
 Boys Golf - 2005 (4th), 2008 (4th), 2019 (5th)
 Girls Basketball - 2010, 2020*
 Boys Basketball - 1952, 1965, 2005
 Baseball - 2019
 Boys Track and Field - 1988 (3rd), 1994 (3rd), 2013 (4th)
 Girls Track and Field - 1986 (3rd), 1988 (4th), 2000 (3rd)

Minster MAC Championships

 Baseball (4): 13, 10, 07, 75
 Boys Basketball (2): 21, 75
 Girls Basketball (17): 21, 19, 17, 16, 11, 04, 03, 02, 98, 97, 96, 80, 79, 78, 77, 76, 75
 Boys Cross Country (12): 21, 19, 18, 17, 15, 13, 09, 07, 00, 99, 87, 86, 78
 Girls Cross Country (32): 21, 20, 19, 18, 17, 16, 15, 14, 13, 10, 09, 08, 07, 06, 05, 04, 03, 02, 01, 00, 99, 98, 97, 96, 95, 90, 89, 88, 87, 86, 85, 84, 83, 82
 Football (5): 19, 89, 88, 87, 75
 Boys Golf (13): 21, 20, 19, 18, 14, 13, 12, 10, 09, 08, 07, 06, 05, 99
 Girls Golf (6): 16, 11, 10, 07, 06, 05
 Softball (4): 21, 19, 18, 14
 Boys Track and Field (16): 21, 16, 15, 14, 12, 11, 10, 01, 99, 98, 97, 96, 94, 92, 88, 87
 Girls Track and Field (31): 21, 18, 17, 16, 15, 14, 13, 04, 03, 02, 01, 00, 99, 98, 92, 91, 89, 88, 87, 86, 85, 84, 83, 82, 81, 80, 79, 78, 77, 76, 75
 Volleyball (4): 79, 76, 75, 74

External links
 District website

Notes and references

High schools in Auglaize County, Ohio
Public high schools in Ohio